This page lists some names of places in Lithuania, as they are called in Lithuanian, and as they are called or were formerly called in other languages spoken by ethnic groups. Which are or have been represented within Lithuanian territory.

Cities

Towns

Places in Vilnius

Elderates

Streets

Squares

Elderates of Kaunas

Rivers

See also
History of Lithuania
Ethnic minorities in Lithuania
Jews in Lithuania
Polish minority in Lithuania
Russian minority in Lithuania
Names of Belarusian places in other languages

References 

Exonyms
 
Places in other languages
Alternative names of European places